The Little Pacha Mosque  is one on the mosques of the medina of Tunis, located in the west of the city. It is also known as the Mosque of the Husainid Hammuda Pacha in opposition to the Mosque of the Muradid Hammuda Pacha.

Localization 
The mosque is situated at number 214, Kasbah Street.

History 
It was constructed in 1805 (1220 Hijri) by Hammuda Pacha, the Husainid bey of Tunis, from 1782 until his death, as indicated by the commemorative plaque.

References 

Mosques in the medina of Tunis
Ottoman architecture in Tunisia
19th-century mosques